When a work's copyright expires, it enters the public domain. The following is a list of works that entered the public domain in 2009. Since laws vary globally, the copyright status of some works are not uniform.

Entered the public domain in countries with life + 70 years
With the exception of Belarus (Life + 50 years) and Spain (Life + 80 years for creators that died before 1987), a work enters the public domain in Europe 70 years after the creator's death, if it was published during the creator's lifetime. The list is sorted alphabetically and includes a notable work of the creator that entered the public domain on January 1, 2009.

Entered the public domain in countries with life + 50 years
In most countries of Africa and Asia, as well as Belarus, Bolivia, Canada, New Zealand, Egypt and Uruguay; a work enters the public domain 50 years after the creator's death.

{|class="wikitable sortable" border="1" style="border-spacing:0; style="width:100%;"
!Names
!Country
!Birth
!Death
!Occupation
!Notable work
|-
| Eleanor Hallowell Abbott
| 
| 
| 
| novelist, poet, short story writer. 
| Molly Make-Believe, But Once A Year: Christmas Stories 
|-
| James Branch Cabell
| 
| 
| 
| fantasy writer. 
| Jurgen, A Comedy of Justice, Biography of the Life of Manuel
|-
|E. Everett Evans
|
| 
| 
|Science fiction author
|
|-
| Margiad Evans
| 
| 
| 
| illustrator, novelist, poet. 
| Country Dance, Autobiography, A Ray of Darkness, The Nightingale Silenced
|-
| Dorothy Canfield Fisher
| 
| 
| 
| literary critic, memoirist, novelist, short story writer, translator. 
| Understood Betsy
|-
| Marjorie Flack
| 
| 
| 
| children's writer, illustrator. 
| writer of The Story About Ping, illustrator of The Country Bunny and the Little Gold Shoes
|-
| Angelina Weld Grimké
| 
| 
| 
| playwright, poet. 
| Rachel, ''|-
| Michael Joseph
| 
| 
| 
| Writer, publisher. 
| How to Write Serial Fiction, Puss in Books: A collection of stories about cats, The Sword in the Scabbard 
|-
| Cyril M. Kornbluth
| 
| 
| 
| science fiction writer
| The Little Black Bag, The Marching Morons|-
| Henry Kuttner
| 
| 
| 
| Writer of fantasy, horror fiction, and science fiction. 
| The Graveyard Rats, Mimsy Were the Borogoves|-
| Rose Macaulay
| 
| 
| 
| biographer, novelist, travel writer. 
| The World My Wilderness, The Towers of Trebizond|-
|Johnston McCulley
|
|
|
|Author
|Zorro
|-
| G. E. Moore
| 
| 
| 
| journal editor, philosopher. 
| Principia Ethica, A Defence of Common Sense|-
| Charles Langbridge Morgan
| 
| 
| 
| novelist, playwright. 
| The Burning Glass|-
| Alfred Noyes
| 
| 
| 
| playwright, poet, short story writer. 
| The Highwayman, Shakespeare's Kingdom
|-
| Seumas O'Sullivan
| 
| 
| 
| magazine editor, poet. 
| Twilight People, Verses Sacred and Profane|-
| Elliot Paul
| 
| 
| 
| journalist, novelist, screenwriter. 
| Life and Death of a Spanish Town, Linden on the Saugus Branch|-
| Nicolae Petrescu-Comnen
| 
| 
| 
| social scientist. 
| Accidente profesionale (Work-related Accidents), Câteva considerațiuni asupra socialismului și asupra roadelor sale (Some Musings on Socialism and Its Results|-
| Peig Sayers
| 
| 
| 
| seanchaí (traditional Gaelic storyteller and historian)
. 
| Peig, Machnamh Seanmhná (An Old Woman's Reflections)
|-
| Robert W. Service
| 
| 
| 
| poet. 
| The Shooting of Dan McGrew, The Cremation of Sam McGee|-
| J. C. Squire
| 
| 
| 
| historian, literary critic, magazine editor, poet. 
| Robin Hood: a farcical romantic pastoral , Shakespeare as a Dramatist|-
| Ethel Turner
| 
| 
| 
| children's writer, novelist. 
| Seven Little Australians|-
| Geoffrey Willans
| 
| 
| 
| children's writer, humorist, novelist, screenwriter. 
| Down with Skool! A Guide to School Life for Tiny Pupils and their Parents, Whizz for Atomms: A Guide to Survival in the 20th Century for Fellow Pupils, their Doting Maters, Pompous Paters and Any Others who are Interested|-
|}

 Entering the public domain in the United States 

In the United States, the copyright status of works extends for the life of the author or artists, plus 70 years. If the work is owned by a corporation, then the copyright extends 95 years.

Due to the passing of the Copyright Term Extension Act (Sonny Bono Copyright Term Extension Act'') in 1998, no new works would enter the public domain in this jurisdiction until 2019.

See also 
 1938 in literature and 1958 in literature for deaths of writers
 Public Domain Day
 Creative Commons

References

External links
Public Domain Day 2009: Freeing the libraries
HAPPY PUBLIC DOMAIN DAY - JANUARY 1, 2009 - NEW ADDITIONS TO UNPUBLISHED PUBLIC DOMAIN IN THE U.S.

Public domain
Public domain